Kikas may refer to:

Anton Kikaš (born 1941), Croatian-Canadian businessman and arms-smuggler
Don Kikas (born 1974), Angolan singer
Frederico Morais (born 1992), Portuguese surfer also known as Kikas
"Kikaš" the Boeing 707 captured from Anton Kikaš and used in the evacuation of civilians from Sarajevo in 1992
Kikas Gomes (born 1980), Angolan basketball player
Kikas (Angolan footballer) (born 1981), Angolan footballer
Kikas (footballer, born 1991), Portuguese footballer who plays as a midfielder
Kikas (footballer, born 1998), Portuguese footballer who plays as a forward

See also

 Kika (disambiguation)
 Kikkas